This is an incomplete list of co-drivers who have entered a World Rally Championship event. Active co-drivers (listed in bold in the tables) are those who have entered a WRC event within the past twelve months.

All WRC co-drivers

Co-drivers